For the state pageant affiliated with Miss Teen USA, see Miss Mississippi Teen USA

The Miss Mississippi's Outstanding Teen competition is the pageant that selects the representative for the U.S. state of Mississippi in the Miss America's Outstanding Teen pageant.

Cameron Davis of Meridian was crowned Miss Mississippi's Outstanding Teen on April 24, 2022 at the Vicksburg City Auditorium in Vicksburg, Mississippi. She competed for the title of Miss America's Outstanding Teen 2023 at the Hyatt Regency Dallas in Dallas, Texas on August 12, 2022.

Results summary 
The year in parentheses indicates year of Miss America's Outstanding Teen competition the award/placement was garnered.

Placements 
 4th runners-up: Molly May (2013)
 Top 10: Jasmine Murray (2008), Jane Granberry (2020)
Top 11: Tori Johnston (2022)

Awards

Preliminary awards 
 Preliminary Talent: Molly May (2013)

Other awards 
 Teens in Action Award Finalists: France Beard (2012), Stella Ford (2017), Presley Caldwell (2019)

Winners

References

External links
 Official website

Mississippi
Mississippi culture
Women in Mississippi